Martin Marković (born 13 January 1996) is a Croatian discus thrower.

He won the gold medal at the 2014 World Junior Championships (and finished sixth in the shot put), won the silver medal at the 2015 European Junior Championships, finished tenth at the 2017 Universiade and sixth at the 2018 Mediterranean Games. He also competed at the 2017 European U23 Championships without reaching the final.

His personal best throw is 63.24 metres, achieved at the 2018 European Throwing Cup in Leiria.

References

1996 births
Living people
Croatian male discus throwers
Athletes (track and field) at the 2018 Mediterranean Games
Competitors at the 2017 Summer Universiade
Mediterranean Games competitors for Croatia
20th-century Croatian people
21st-century Croatian people
Athletes (track and field) at the 2022 Mediterranean Games
Mediterranean Games silver medalists for Croatia
Mediterranean Games medalists in athletics